Bella Nancy Paredes Arreaga (born 25 February 2002) is an Ecuadorian weightlifter. She won two silver medals at the 2022 Bolivarian Games held in Valledupar, Colombia. She is also a former artistic gymnast.

Career 

She competed in the girls' +63kg event at the 2018 Summer Youth Olympics held in Buenos Aires, Argentina. She finished in 4th place. At the time, she finished in 5th place but Supatchanin Khamhaeng of Thailand was stripped of her gold medal after testing positive for a banned substance. She won the bronze medal in the women's 76kg event at the 2019 Youth World Weightlifting Championships held in Las Vegas, United States.

In 2021, she won the silver medal in the women's 76kg event at the Junior World Weightlifting Championships held in Tashkent, Uzbekistan. She won the gold medal in the women's 87kg event at the 2021 Junior Pan American Games held in Cali and Valle, Colombia.

She won the gold medal in the women's 76kg event at the 2022 Junior World Weightlifting Championships held in Heraklion, Greece. She won two silver medals at the 2022 Bolivarian Games held in Valledupar, Colombia. She won the bronze medal in the women's 76kg Snatch event at the 2022 World Weightlifting Championships held in Bogotá, Colombia.

She competed in artistic gymnastics before switching to weightlifting.

Achievements

References

External links 
 

Living people
2002 births
Place of birth missing (living people)
Ecuadorian female artistic gymnasts
Ecuadorian female weightlifters
Weightlifters at the 2018 Summer Youth Olympics
21st-century Ecuadorian women